Stridon was a town in the Roman province of Dalmatia. The town is known as the birthplace of Saint Jerome. From Stridon also came the priest Lupicinus of Stridon. Although Domnus of Pannonia, a bishop who took part in the First Council of Nicaea, is often said to have hailed from or been bishop of Stridon, he was in fact bishop of Sirmium. In 379 the town was destroyed by the Goths. Jerome wrote about it in his work De viris illustribus: "Jerome was born to his father Eusebius, [in the] town of Strido, which the Goths overthrew, and was once at the border between Dalmatia and Pannonia." ("Hieronymus patre Eusebio natus, oppido Stridonis, quod a Gothis eversum, Dalmatiae quondam Pannoniaeque confinium fuit...").

The exact location of Stridon is unknown. It is possible Stridon was located either in modern Croatia or Slovenia. Possible locations are the vicinity of Ljubljana, Starod (Slovenia), Sdrin, Štrigova, Zrenj, Zrin (Croatia) and many others in both countries.

References

Roman towns and cities in Croatia
Jerome
Former populated places in Croatia
Roman towns and cities in Slovenia
History of Dalmatia